Sevareid is a surname. Notable people with the surname include:

 Alfred and Clara Sevareid, former owners of the Alfred and Clara Sevareid House, registered in the American National Register of Historic Places 
 Eric Sevareid (1912–1992), American journalist